Stegna  (or Steegen-Kobbelgrube) is a village in Nowy Dwór Gdański County, Pomeranian Voivodeship, in northern Poland. It is the seat of the gmina (administrative district) called Gmina Stegna.

The village has a population of 2,337.

The first documents confirming the existence of a Roman Catholic church in Steegen date back to the 14th century. According to sources from 1465, there was a Gothic church in Steegen. 

In 1609, the German pastor Georg Klein built a small wooden Lutheran church, which burned down in 1676. Only the tower, organ, altar furnishings and a bell remained from the Thirty  Years' War. On the site of the old Lutheran church began on March 25, 1681, the works on the construction of a new one under the direction of Peter Willer - architect, surveyor and mechanic of the city of Danzig. The construction of the baroque church, according to the chronicle, was very expensive (e.g. the carpenter Peter Kamrath received: 2000 guilders, 8 barrels of beer and 6 spruces. Andreas Bosche received 1150 guilders for building the tower and wood from the old tower that has been preserved). On November 29, 1681 - the first Sunday in Advent - preacher Martinus Krüger consecrated the church.On May 25, 1682 the construction of the choir was completed, and on June 15, 1683 the organ was expanded. The tower is a work by Bosche, the cross and the flag by Daniel Madler. The works were finally completed on November 17, 1683 - this year can be seen on the flag, which many researchers incorrectly interpret as the year the church was built. The new tower also has a bell from 1643 , which survived the fire, which still chimes at 12 noon every day, and two larger ones - from 1732. The bell, over three hundred years old, bears an inscription in Latin: "Domine, da pacem in diebus nostris", which means: "Lord, give peace to our time." The church in Steegen was taken away from the Lutheran Church in 1945 when the inhabitants were forced to flee westward by the newly established Polish authorities and Stegna became part of Poland after WW II.

List of Lutheran pastors:

 George Klein, from 1605
 Nicolaus Weismann, til 1609
 Wendelius Walch, 1609–1636
 Jacob Werner, 1617–1618
 Johann Wendelin, 1618–1620
 Andreas Hettichius, 1620–1629
 David Huberus, 1630–1631
 Gottfried Stegmann, 1631–1651
 Johann Dözing, from 1651
 Heinrich Königshaven, 1652–1667
 Christian Omuth, 1657–1667
 George Bauer, 1667–1670
 Andreas Barth, 1670–1674
 Martin Krieger, 1674–1681
 Abraham Belitzki, 1681–1697
 Jacob Struve, 1697–1698
 Peter Goltz, 1698–1711
 Johann Goffried Palm, 1711–1716
 Johann Adam Artzberger, 1716–1719
 Peter Elert, 1719–1720
 Christoph Schmidt, 1720–1735
 Johann Eilhard Meyer, 1735–1759
 Arend Jantzen, 1759–1795
 Abraham Benjamin Skusa, 1795–1807
 Johann Erdmann Klatt, 1807–1824
 Carl Joachim Weickhmann, 1825–1860
 Eduard Hermann Martini, 1860–1875
 Gustav Ed. Feyerabendt, 1860–1867
 August Eduard Klein, 1867–1889
 Carl Gustav Marter, 1873–1875
 Eduard Hermann Martini, 1875–1880
 Egbert Michalik, 1888–1889
 Franz Ferdinand Totz, 1889–1891
 Ernst Walter R. Michalik, 1889–1930
 Otto Eduard Friedrich Villmow, 1891–1893
 Hans Ludwig August Hankwiz, 1893–1928
 Alfred Hüneke, 1927–1929
 Arthur Datschewski, 1930–1940
 Hermann Dingler, 1940–1942

Notable residents
Christiane Blumhoff (born 1942), German actress

See also
Jantar
Sztutowo
Stutthof concentration camp

References

Stegna